Cosmopterix melanarches is a moth in the family Cosmopterigidae. It was described by Edward Meyrick in 1928. It is found on the Society Islands.

References

Moths described in 1928
melanarches